Hacked Up for Barbecue is the debut studio album by American death metal band Mortician, released on January 28, 1997 by Relapse Records. The album was later reissued as a two-on-one package with the band's 1998 EP Zombie Apocalypse.

Critical reception
Tom Schulte of Allmusic gave Hacked Up for Barbeque three out of five stars, saying that it "should herald a long career of brutal noise, paying homage to sick flicks. One can wager that the gorecore here is better than any of the Z-movies quoted." The San Diego Union-Tribune called the album "wicked and menacing," writing that Mortician "somehow discovers drama between blasts of heavy guitar and drums."

Track listing

Personnel
Mortician
 Will Rahmer — bass, vocals
 Roger Beaujard — guitar, drum programming

Production
 Desmond Tolhurst and Mortician — producers
 Matthew F. Jacobson and William J. Yurkiewicz Jr. — executive producers
 Desmond Tolhurst — engineer
 Roger J. Beaujard — assistant engineer
 Dave Shirk and Bill Yurkiewicz — mastering
 Wes Benscoter — cover art

Notes

References

Mortician (band) albums
1997 albums
Albums with cover art by Wes Benscoter